Columbus is a crater in the Terra Sirenum of Mars.  It is 119 km in diameter and was named after Christopher Columbus, Italian explorer (1451–1506).  The discovery of sulfates and clay minerals in sediments within Columbus crater are strong evidence that a lake once existed in the crater.  Research with an orbiting near-infrared spectrometer, which reveals the types of minerals present based on the wavelengths of light they absorb, found evidence of layers of both clay and sulfates in Columbus crater.  This is exactly what would appear if a large lake had slowly evaporated.   Moreover, because some layers contained gypsum, a sulfate which forms in relatively fresh water, life could have formed in the crater.

Layers 
Columbus crater contains layers, also called strata. In Columbus crater, the CRISM instrument on the Mars Reconnaissance Orbiter found kaolinite, hydrated sulfates including alunite and possibly jarosite. Further study concluded that gypsum, polyhydrated and monohydrated Mg/Fe-sulfates were common and small deposits of montmorillonite, Fe/Mg-phyllosilicates, and crystalline ferric oxide or hydroxide were found. Thermal emission spectra suggest that some minerals were in the tens of percent range.

See also
 Groundwater on Mars
 Geology of Mars
 HiRISE
 Lakes on Mars
 List of craters on Mars
 List of quadrangles on Mars
 Geological history of Mars
 Water on Mars

References

Memnonia quadrangle
Impact craters on Mars